EFC Uganda Limited (EFCUL), also known as EFC Uganda, is a microfinance deposit-taking institution (MDI) in Uganda. It is licensed and supervised by the Bank of Uganda, the central bank and national banking regulator. EFCUL lends primarily to small enterprises.

Location
The coordinates of the institution's headquarters are 00°20'12.0"N, 32°35'15.0"E (Latitude:0.336667; Longitude:32.587500).

Overview
The institution opened in Uganda in June 2012 as Entrepreneurs Financial Center Limited, with one branch in Ndeeba in the Lubaga Division of Kampala. In November 2014, EFCUL was awarded an MDI banking license by the Bank of Uganda, adopting the name EFC Uganda Limited. As of December 2021, EFCUL owned assets of UGX:112.8 billion, with shareholders' equity of UGX:12.982 billion. At that time, the institution employed 136 staff. EFCUL focuses on financing micro, medium, and small enterprises. In December 2015, EFCUL received a loan of UGX:10 billion for onward lending to micro, small, and medium-sized businesses.

Shareholding
As of August 2016, the shareholding in the stock of the company was as depicted in the table below:

Branches
, the institution maintained networked branches at the following locations: 

 Kololo Branch - Ground Floor, Acacia Place Building, 6 Acacia Avenue, Kololo, Kampala 
 Ndeeba Branch - Master Wood Plaza, 1156 Kampala-Masaka Road, Ndeeba, Kampala Main Branch
 Kireka Branch - 1525 Kampala-Jinja Road, Kireka
 Nansana Branch - Kampala-Hoima Road, Nansana
 Nateete Branch - 1396 Kampala-Masaka Road, Nateete
 Mukono branch

See also
 Banking in Uganda
 List of banks in Uganda
 FINCA Uganda Limited
 Pride Microfinance Limited
 UGAFODE Microfinance Limited

References

External links
 Website of EFC Uganda Limited

Banks of Uganda
Companies based in Kampala
Banks established in 2012
2012 establishments in Uganda